Ust-Nera Airport  is an airport serving the urban locality of Ust-Nera, Oymyakonsky District, in the Sakha Republic of Russia.

Airlines and destinations

External links

References

  

Airports built in the Soviet Union
Airports in the Sakha Republic